The Northern Pacific Railroad Shops Historic District, located in Brainerd, in the U.S. state of Minnesota is a set of buildings built by the Northern Pacific Railroad and later listed on the National Register of Historic Places.

It was built in 1882 using stone, brick, slate, concrete, and asphalt. The buildings were designed and built by the railroad to construct and repair equipment.

The buildings were listed on the National Register of Historic Places in 1989.

References

Buildings and structures in Crow Wing County, Minnesota
Industrial buildings and structures on the National Register of Historic Places in Minnesota
Northern Pacific Railway
Railway workshops in the United States
Historic districts on the National Register of Historic Places in Minnesota
National Register of Historic Places in Crow Wing County, Minnesota
Railway workshops on the National Register of Historic Places
Railway buildings and structures on the National Register of Historic Places in Minnesota